Lavatbura and Lamusong are dialects of an Austronesian language of New Ireland, Papua New Guinea.

References

Languages of New Ireland Province
Meso-Melanesian languages